Tommy Flanagan was an American jazz pianist. His appearances on record date from 1956 to 2001 and include more than 30 albums under his own name and more than 200 as a sideman.

Discography

As leader/co-leader

As sideman

Main sources:

References

Jazz discographies
Discographies of American artists